The Brāhma-sphuṭa-siddhānta ("Correctly Established Doctrine of Brahma", abbreviated BSS)
is the main work of Brahmagupta, written c. 628. This text of mathematical astronomy contains significant mathematical content, including a good understanding of the role of zero, rules for manipulating both negative and positive numbers, a method for computing square roots, methods of solving linear and quadratic equations, and rules for summing series, Brahmagupta's identity,  and Brahmagupta theorem.

The book was written completely in verse and does not contain any kind of mathematical notation.  Nevertheless, it contained the first clear description of the quadratic formula (the solution of the quadratic equation).

Positive and negative numbers
Brāhmasphuṭasiddhānta is one of the first books to provide concrete ideas on positive numbers, negative numbers, and zero. For example, it notes that the sum of a positive number and a negative number is their difference or, if they are equal, zero; that subtracting a negative number is equivalent to adding a positive number; that the product of two negative numbers is positive. Some of the notions of fractions differ from the modern rational number system. In modern mathematics, division by zero is undefined for any field.

Influence 

Ashadhara, the son of Rihluka, wrote Graha-jnana with tables based on Brahma-sphuta-siddhanta in 1132. This work is also known by the names Graha-ganita, Brahma-tulyanayana, Bhaumadi-panchagraha-nayana, Kshanika-grahanayana, or simply Ashadhara. Harihara wrote an extended version of the Graha-jnana around 1575 CE.

References

External links

  Brahmasphutasiddhanta at GRETIL (mathematical chapters: 12, 18-20, 21.17-23)
 

Indian mathematics
Mathematics manuscripts
Sanskrit texts
7th-century manuscripts
History of algebra
Treatises
Indian astronomy texts
Brahmagupta